Al-Aziziyah  is a Syrian village located in Al-Hamraa Nahiyah in Hama District, Hama.  According to the Syria Central Bureau of Statistics (CBS), Aziziyeh, Hama had a population of 533 in the 2004 census. During Syria Civil War, Al-Aziziyah was captured by ISIS from Opposition, then on 6 February 2018, Al-Aziziyah was liberated by SAA.

References 

Populated places in Hama District